Dracaenura aegialitis is a moth of the family Pyralidae. It was described by Edward Meyrick in 1910. It is found in New Zealand, where it has been recorded from the Kermadec Islands.

References

 "Dracaenura aegialitis". InsectIn.com.

Moths described in 1910
Spilomelinae